Bridge House School, commonly referred to as Bridge House, is a school in South Africa. It is located in the Cape Winelands close to Franschhoek, Stellenbosch and Paarl, and is an independent day and boarding school for over eight hundred girls and boys from Playschool to Grade 12 . Bridge House is a member of the Independent Schools Association of Southern Africa (ISASA), the International Round Square Organisation. The School motto is "Learning for Life".

History

Bridge House was founded by a group of local families, namely the Huxter, Friedman and Rands families, as a non-profit company and opened its doors on 19 January 1995 with 54 pupils. The school was originally based in a state school building in Simondium until 1997. Rezoning applications were brought forth and approved for the school to occupy new premises in the Berg River Valley on the Waterval Farm. In July 1998 the school relocated to the new and larger campus situated on a 10-hectare site; an undeveloped corner of farm near the Berg River Bridge donated by the late Graham Beck in 1994, ten kilometres outside Franschhoek. Bridge House currently owns 28 hectares of land after receiving an additional donated 18 hectares.

References

Round Square schools
Educational institutions established in 1995
1995 establishments in South Africa